Candu or CANDU may refer to
CANDU reactor (CANada Deuterium Uranium), a Canadian pressurized heavy water reactor
Advanced CANDU reactor
CANDU Owners Group
Candu Energy, a Canadian organization specializing in the design and supply of nuclear reactors and related products and services
Andrian Candu (born 1975), a Moldovan politician